Shrinivas Joshi (born 1967) is an Indian classical vocalist. He belongs to Kirana Gharana.

Early life
Shrinivas Joshi was born to legendary Hindustani vocalist, Bhimsen Joshi and Vatsalabai Joshi. He did his B.Tech from IIT Delhi, but decided to devote his time to music.

Career
Shrinivas Joshi started performing when he was 25 and gave his first solo when he was 30. He regularly performs at Sawai Gandharva Bhimsen Festival. He is the president of Arya Sangeet Prasarak Mandal.

References

External links
 shrinivasjoshi.com

Hindustani singers
Kannada people
1971 births
Living people
21st-century Indian male classical singers
IIT Delhi alumni
Kirana gharana
Singers from Pune